Early general elections were held in Kuwait on 26 November 2016. They follow the dissolution of the parliament elected in 2013 by Emir Sabah Al-Ahmad Al-Jaber Al-Sabah in October 2016. Under the constitution, elections must be held within two months. Opposition candidates won 24 of the 50 seats in the National Assembly. Voter turnout was around 70 percent.

Electoral system
The 50 elected members of the National Assembly were elected from five 10-seat constituencies by single non-transferable vote.

Results
Opposition Islamist candidates (Muslim Brotherhood and Salafi) won around half of the 24 seats won by the opposition, whilst the Shia minority was reduced to six seats from ten seats. One woman was elected, with only around 20 of the 42 MPs seeking re-election retaining their seats. Members of Kuwait's largest tribes together won just seven seats in the election, down from fifteen.

Aftermath
Following the elections, a new Speaker of the National Assembly was elected on 11 December. Marzouq Al-Ghanim was elected with 48 votes, defeating Abdullah Al-Roumi (9 votes) and Shueib Al-Muweizri (8 votes).

References

2016 in Kuwait
Kuwait
Election and referendum articles with incomplete results
Elections in Kuwait
November 2016 events in Asia